This is the discography of the band Ambrosia.

Albums

Studio albums

Live albums

Compilation albums

Singles

References

External links
 

Discographies of American artists
Pop music group discographies